Frank Earl Hering (April 30, 1874 – July 11, 1943) was an American football player and coach of football, basketball, and baseball. He served as the head football coach at the University of Notre Dame from 1896 to 1898, compiling a record of 12–6–1 Hering was also the first basketball coach at Notre Dame, coaching one season in 1897–98, and helmed the school's baseball team for three seasons, from 1897 to 1899.

Hering was born in Sunbury, Pennsylvania and played quarterback for the Chicago Maroons in 1893 and 1894. His first head coaching job was with the Bucknell Bison in 1895. The next year, he arrived at Notre Dame as a student to play quarterback for the football team. He earned a Notre Dame bachelor's degree in 1898 and a law degree in 1902. In 1898, he took on the job of directing the entire athletic department, including coaching the football and baseball teams, and introducing basketball to the university. He earned the title of "Father of Notre Dame Football" for his success in expanding the football program from an intramural activity to a full-fledged intercollegiate sport. Hering gave the primary speech at the dedication ceremony of Notre Dame Stadium in 1930.

Hering is also recognized by the Fraternal Order of Eagles as the "Father of Mother's Day" for his work in promoting the establishment of a national holiday, having given public speeches supporting the idea as early as 1904. Hering was a member of Phi Gamma Delta fraternity.

Hering and his wife, Claribel, were known for their outreach programs in South Bend, Indiana, including the establishment of Hering House—a community center for African-Americans. Hering House was located at 732 W. Division Street, later renamed Western Avenue.

Hering died July 11, 1943, at his home in South Bend, Indiana, following several weeks of illness.

Head coaching record

Football

References

Additional sources

 
 

1874 births
1943 deaths
19th-century players of American football
American football quarterbacks
Basketball coaches from Pennsylvania
Bucknell Bison football coaches
Chicago Maroons football players
Notre Dame Fighting Irish baseball coaches
Notre Dame Fighting Irish football coaches
Notre Dame Fighting Irish football players
Notre Dame Fighting Irish men's basketball coaches
University of Notre Dame faculty
People from Sunbury, Pennsylvania
Players of American football from Pennsylvania